Radwan Yasser or Yasser Radwan (born 22 April 1972) is an Egyptian former professional footballer who played as a midfielder. He was a member of the Egypt national football team in the Africa Cup of Nations in 1996, 1998, 2000 and 2002, winning the tournament with the national squad in 1998.

Radwan played professional football abroad with German side F.C. Hansa Rostock.

International goals
Scores and results list Egypt's goal tally first, score column indicates score after each Radwan goal.

References

Living people
1972 births
People from Dakahlia Governorate
Association football midfielders
Egyptian footballers
Egypt international footballers
Baladeyet El Mahalla SC players
Al Ahly SC players
FC Hansa Rostock players
Ghazl El Mahalla SC players
Egyptian Premier League players
Bundesliga players
1996 African Cup of Nations players
1998 African Cup of Nations players
2000 African Cup of Nations players
2002 African Cup of Nations players
1999 FIFA Confederations Cup players
Egyptian expatriate sportspeople in Germany
Expatriate footballers in Germany